Bethany College may refer to:

Australia 
 Bethany College (Sydney), New South Wales

Canada 
 Bethany Bible College, New Brunswick
 Bethany College (Saskatchewan)

United States 
 Bethany College (Kansas), Lindsborg, Kansas
 Bethany College (West Virginia)
 Bethany College (Louisiana), Baton Rouge, Louisiana
 Bethany Global University, Bloomington, Minnesota
 Bethany Lutheran College, Mankato, Minnesota
 Bethany Lutheran Theological Seminary, Mankato, Minnesota
 Bethany Theological Seminary, Richmond, Indiana
 Bethany University, Scotts Valley, California, formerly known as Bethany Bible College and Bethany College
 College of the Sisters of Bethany, Topeka, Kansas

See also
Bethany (disambiguation)